Trolltinden (singular) or Trolltindane (plural) are the names of several summits or mountain ranges in Norway:

Innlandet county
 Trolltinden (Innlandet) (2,018 m) in Rondane, previously called Sagtinden

Møre og Romsdal county
 Trolltindane, a mountain ridge in Rauma, on the western side of Romsdalen valley, including:
 Store Trolltind (1,788 m), near Troll Wall in Rauma, part of Trolltindane in Rauma
 Trollveggen or Troll Wall in Rauma, a vertical rock face, part of Trolltindane
 Trollryggen a summit and pillar in Trolltindane range
 Trolltindane (890 m), mountains along the border of the municipalities Eide and Fræna
 Trolltinden (Møre og Romsdal) (1,170 m), also called Brustinden, in Vestnes

Nordland county
 Trolltinden (Nordland) (426 m), in Andøy